Kira Hagi (born 31 March 1996) is a Romanian actress. She was born in Barcelona, Spain. Her first theatre actuation was Fetița cu chibrituri ("The girl with matches"). On her last year of Baccalaureate, she began to form herself with the help of the actor and professor Filip Ristovski. In 2013, Hagi started acting professionally for her debuting film București, te iubesc ("Bucharest, I love you") at age 17. The film came out in 2014. Posteriorly, Hagi was admitted to the New York Film Academy and studied in the United States for three years, but returned to Romania some time after. Hagi has also made several paintings, some of which have been sold or exposed in public galleries and private collections.

Kira Hagi is the daughter of the famous Romanian footballer Gheorghe Hagi and his wife Marilena Hagi. She also has one brother, Ianis Hagi, who is a footballer as well. Since her father is of Aromanian descent, she is part Aromanian as well.

Since 2014, when București, te iubesc came out, Hagi has participated in several other movies. Examples include Between Pain and Amen, By the Book, Dream Girl, Fragile and Plain Jane and the Dating Game. She also played a role in 2021 in the children series Waffles + Mochi.

References

External links
 
 

1996 births
Living people
Romanian film actresses
21st-century Romanian actresses
Romanian people of Aromanian descent
Aromanian actors
New York Film Academy alumni